The State University System of Florida (SUSF or SUS) is a system of twelve public universities in the U.S. state of Florida. As of 2018, over 341,000 students were enrolled in Florida's state universities. Together with the Florida College System, which includes Florida's 28 community colleges and state colleges, it is part of Florida's system of public higher education. The system, headquartered in Tallahassee, is overseen by a chancellor and governed by the Florida Board of Governors.

The Florida Board of Governors was created in 2003 to centralize the administration of the State University System of Florida. Previously, Florida's State University System had been governed by the Florida Board of Regents (1965–2001) and the Florida Board of Control (1905–1965).

History and governance
Prior to 1905, Florida's state institutions were governed by a Board of Education and even earlier variations thereof, reaching back to the Florida Constitution of 1838 wherein higher education and normal education was established, based on grants of land from the U.S. Congress. From 1905 to 1965, the few universities in the system were governed by the Florida Board of Control. The Board of Control was replaced by the Florida Board of Regents in 1965, to accommodate the growing university system. The Board of Regents governed until it was disbanded by the Florida Legislature in 2001, and its authority was divided between the Florida Board of Education (which was given some authority over all levels of public education in the state), and appointed university boards of trustees, which operated independently for each separate institution. In 2002, Floridians led by U.S. senator Bob Graham passed an amendment to the Florida Constitution establishing a new statewide governing body, the Florida Board of Governors.

In early 2023, Governor Ron DeSantis announced a ban in Florida public universities on any diversity, equity, and inclusion programs, as well as any teaching of "critical race theory". This announcement came on the heels of similar changes being implemented in the Florida College System, and DeSantis appointing a new, right-wing majority to the New College of Florida board of trustees, most notably including Christopher Rufo.

Member institutions

Gallery

See also

Florida College System
Florida Student Association
 Florida Department of Education
 Advisory Council of Faculty Senates
 List of colleges and universities in Florida

References

External links
 

 
F
 
Educational institutions established in 1905
1905 establishments in Florida